Onesimo Cadiz Gordoncillo (February 16, 1935 − November 13, 2013) was a Filipino Roman Catholic archbishop.

Born in Jimalalud, Negros Oriental, in 1935 and ordained to the priesthood in 1961, he was named auxiliary bishop of the Roman Catholic Diocese of Dumaguete, Philippines in 1974. Gordoncillo was then named bishop of the Roman Catholic Diocese of Tagbilaran in 1976 and then Archbishop of the Archdiocese of Capiz in 1986 and retired in 2011.

References

1935 births
2013 deaths
People from Negros Oriental
21st-century Roman Catholic archbishops in the Philippines
Roman Catholic bishops of Tagbilaran
Roman Catholic archbishops of Capiz